Raymond E. Gardiner High School (RGHS) is a public high school in Bottle Creek, North Caicos, Turks and Caicos Islands.

It was established in 1973 as North Caicos Junior High School.

Raymond Gardiner High School Playfield is a multi-use sporting facility. It is currently used for athletics, soccer and rugby union competitions.

References

 Raymond Gardiner High. Retrieved 2020-02-09

Further reading
 School Magazine 2008-2009

External links 
 Raymond E. Gardiner High School at WordPress
 Ask teacher and editor at Facebook
 Raymond Gardiner High School sports events
 Wikimapia

Secondary schools in British Overseas Territories
Schools in the Turks and Caicos Islands
Football venues in the Turks and Caicos Islands
Athletics (track and field) venues in the Turks and Caicos Islands
Rugby union stadiums in the Turks and Caicos Islands
1973 establishments in the British Empire
1973 establishments in North America
Educational institutions established in 1973